Animal Welfare Network Nepal is non-profit body that helps to increase the effectiveness of animal welfare organizations in Nepal.

Objectives
Coordinate the activities of animal welfare organizations
Raise awareness on animal welfare issues among the public
Lobby and advocate for animal rights
Promote stray dog adoptions
Provide education and support to its members

See also
List of animal rights groups

References

Animal rights organizations
Animal welfare organisations based in Nepal